is a Japanese footballer who plays for FC Gifu in the J3 League.

Career statistics
Updated to end of 2018 season.

1Includes Japanese Super Cup and FIFA Club World Cup.

National Team Career
As of 6 October 2010

Appearances in major competitions

References

External links

Profile at Urawa Red Diamonds

1991 births
Living people
Association football people from Kanagawa Prefecture
Japanese footballers
J1 League players
J2 League players
J3 League players
Shonan Bellmare players
Thespakusatsu Gunma players
Urawa Red Diamonds players
Kashiwa Reysol players
Avispa Fukuoka players
Tochigi SC players
FC Gifu players
Association football midfielders